Carrie Underwood: Live in Concert, also known as Some Hearts Tour, is the first headlining tour for American recording artist, Carrie Underwood. Performing during the spring and summer of 2006, the tour promoted her debut album, Some Hearts. The tour predominantly performed in the United States and Canada, at various music festivals and state fairs.

Opening acts
Little Big Town 
Michelle Crowley 
Rio Grand 
Rockie Lynne 
Trent Tomlinson 
Andy Griggs 
Jamey Johnson

Setlist
"We're Young and Beautiful"
"That's Where it Is"
"Wasted"
"Lessons Learned"
"Don't Forget to Remember Me"
"Inside Your Heaven"
"Patience"
"Sweet Child O' Mine"
"Before He Cheats"
"I Just Can't Live a Lie"
"The Night Before (Life Goes On)"
"Jesus, Take the Wheel"
"Some Hearts"
Encore
 "Whenever You Remember"
 "I Ain't in Checotah Anymore"

Notes
Underwood has also been known to do covers of Guns N' Roses songs at many of her shows. During the "Live 2006 Tour", she covered the songs "Patience" and "Sweet Child O' Mine", both of which were originally done by the rock band. Underwood has also performed the band's songs "Paradise City" and "November Rain" on numerous occasions, as well.

Tour dates

Festivals and other miscellaneous performances

This concert was a part of the "North Carolina Azalea Festival"
This concert was a part of "Country Thunder"
This concert was a part of "SunFest"
This concert was a part of the "Dixon May Fair"
This concert was a part of the "Virginia Beach Patriotic Festival"
This concert was a part of the "Country Fever"
This concert was a part of the "Comstock Windmill Festival"
This concert was a part of the "CMA Music Festival"
This concert was a part of the "Country Jam USA"
This concert was a part of the "Country Fest"
This concert was a part of the "San Diego County Fair Summer Concert Series"
This concert was a part of the "Country Concert 26th Annual Music Festival"
This concert was a part of "Summerfest"
This concert was a part of the "Fowlerville Family Fair"
This concert was a part of "Jamboree in the Hills"
This concert was a part of the "2006 Army Concert Tour"
This concert was a part of the "North Dakota State Fair"
This concert was a part of the "Montana State Fair"
This concert was a part of the "California Mid-State Fair"
This concert was a part of the "Oregon Jamboree"
This concert was a part of the "Sioux Empire Fair"
This concert was a part of "Musikfest"
This concert was a part of the "State Fair of West Virginia"
This concert was a part of the "Erie County Fair"
This concert was a part of the "Missouri State Fair"
This concert was a part of the "Champlain Valley Fair"
This concert was a part of the "Cingular Wireless Concert Series"
This concert was a part of the "Colorado State Fair"
This concert was a part of the "New Mexico State Fair"
This concert was a part of the "Kansas State Fair"
This concert was a part of the "York Fair"
This concert was a part of the "Cumberland County Fair"
This concert was a part of the "Clark County Country Jamboree" 
This concert was a part of the "Bloomsburg Fair"
This concert was a part of the "Eastern States Exposition"

Cancellations and rescheduled shows

External links
Carrie Underwood Official Website

References 

2006 concert tours
Carrie Underwood concert tours